David Lanre Messan (born 4 March 1983), is a Nigerian entrepreneur, Founder and CEO of FirstFounders, James Currey Society Scholar, and 2015 Curator of Lagos Global Shaper of the World Economic Forum.

Life 
Messan was born in Isolo, Lagos State on 4 March 1983 to Addi Anthony Messan (father) and Janet Glohoun (mother) who were both of Nigerian and Togolese ancestry. He started his educational journey at Mushin High School where he obtained his secondary school certificate (SSCE) and then proceeded to Lagos State Polytechnic to study Mass Communication. He read Entrepreneurship and Innovation at Scalabl Global Academy and Disruptive Strategy from Harvard Business School and has a diploma in Marketing Strategy from Nexford University.

Career
In 2006, he founded his first company, Infinite Impact Company; an ideas portfolio management firm.

He has also worked as Head of Marketing and Communications for both Universal Anchor Limited and Maku Sports group and was appointed communications consultant to the Lagos State Public Service Staff Development Centre where he developed case studies for civil servants' work patterns for use by the Lagos State Government led by Babatunde Raji Fashola.

Lanre served as an international partner, and later a senator for Nigeria with the World Business Angels Investment Forum (WBAF), Turkey.

References 

Businesspeople from Lagos
21st-century Nigerian businesspeople
Nigerian chief executives
Living people
Nigerian businesspeople
1983 births